William Patrick Thomas O'Hara  (born 28 November 1958) is an Irish sailor from Northern Ireland. He competed at the 1984 Summer Olympics and the 1988 Summer Olympics.

O'Hara was appointed Officer of the Order of the British Empire (OBE) in the 2021 New Year Honours for services to sailing.

References

External links
 

1958 births
Living people
Irish male sailors (sport)
Olympic sailors of Ireland
Sailors at the 1984 Summer Olympics – Finn
Sailors at the 1988 Summer Olympics – Finn
Sportspeople from Belfast
Officers of the Order of the British Empire